Wong Nai Chung Reservoir Park is a park and artificial lake in the Wong Nai Chung Gap, Wong Nai Chung, Hong Kong, located near Hong Kong Parkview. It was formerly Wong Nai Chung Reservoir, a closed reservoir in Hong Kong.

Background
Wong Nai Chung Reservoir was the third reservoir in Hong Kong, built in 1889 in Tai Tam Reservoir Road, Wong Nai Chung. Before closure, it had only water storage capacity of just , only 38% of the size of its Pok Fu Lam counterpart. Because of its small water storage capacity, the British Hong Kong Government decided to cease operations at the reservoir. The reservoir was then converted to Wong Nai Chung Reservoir Park and opened to the public in 1986. It provided water sports facilities like sampans and boats till 14 February 2017.

Some of the components of the reservoir, including the weir, the dam and the valve house, were classified as Grade III historic buildings.

A total of 41 pre-World War II waterworks structures located in six reservoir areas, namely Pok Fu Lam Reservoir, Tai Tam Group of Reservoirs, Wong Nai Chung Reservoir, Kowloon Reservoir, Shing Mun (Jubilee) Reservoir and Aberdeen Reservoir, were declared as monuments in September 2009. The weir, the dam and value house of Wong Nai Chung Reservoir are now declared monuments.

References

Infrastructure completed in 1889
1986 establishments in Hong Kong
Wong Nai Chung Gap
Reservoirs in Hong Kong
Urban public parks and gardens in Hong Kong
Declared monuments of Hong Kong